New Skete or Nea Skiti is one of two Orthodox Christian sketes of Agiou Pavlou Monastery in the monastic state of Mount Athos. It lies on the Aegean sea shore between Agiou Pavlou Monastery (monastery of Saint Paul) and the Skete of Saint Anne, on the southwestern side of the peninsula of Athos (a 30-minute walk from Agiou Pavlou). It belongs administratively to the Skete of Saint Anne.

Overview 
The New Skete speaks Greek, follows the idiorrhythmic way of monastic life, and is inhabited by about 40 monastics living in about 33 residences. The Skete is built on the steep and rocky side of Mount Athos. The monastics support themselves by painting icons and cultivating olive trees and other small-scale agricultural products. Religious memorabilia, books, and other items are available for purchase on New Skete's website.

The Skete is in possession of some 200 ancient manuscripts in its library and 500 old printed books, in addition to many relics. It is possible that the Skete was built on the site of what used to be a city. These speculations are supported by many graves, coins and artifacts which have been found there.

Recently, concerns have started to arise over the longevity of the original Katholikon built in 1760 because of its precarious position next to a cliff overlooking the sea. Landslides caused by weather erosion have begun to threaten the foundation of the church and have led to concerns.

History 
The Skete was founded on 15 March 1753, at the request of some monks who already lived there, with the name of either Saint Benedict or Holy Cross. It was later slightly relocated and renamed. In some historical documents it is referred to as the Skete of Pyrgos. The central church, or Katholikon was built in 1760 and was dedicated to the Nativity of the Theotokos. A chapel was erected adjacent to the main church, dedicated to All Saints. The belltower dates back to the Komnenian Era.

Notable people 
 In 1953, Saint Joseph the Hesychast moved with his brotherhood to New Skete and lived in a cell there until his repose in 1959. The original tomb of Saint Joseph (until his body was exhumed and relics were given to various monasteries) still exits in his chapel in New Skete. He was buried in the holy chapel of the Annunciation of the Virgin Mary. His tomb is a sacred place for many Orthodox Christians who have the ability to visit it.
 Fr. Seraphim the Anchorite was an anchorite under Fr. Neophytos of St. Demetrios' cell in New Skete.
 Elder Elpidios (twin brother of martyr Philoumenos of Jacob's Well) lived in New Skete and was considered to be a very holy elder.

Map with key 

Map key:

References

Sketes in Mount Athos
Greek Orthodox monasteries
Agiou Pavlou Monastery